Muhammad Ali is widely regarded by many boxing commentators and historians as the greatest heavyweight boxer of all time. Boxing magazine The Ring named him number 1 in a 1998 ranking of greatest heavyweights from all eras. In 1999, The Associated Press voted Ali the number one heavyweight of the 20th century. In 1999, Ali was named the second greatest boxer in history, pound for pound, by ESPN; behind only welterweight and middleweight legend Sugar Ray Robinson. In December 2007, ESPN listed Ali second in its choice of the greatest heavyweights of all time, behind Joe Louis. He was inducted into the International Boxing Hall of Fame in the inaugural class of 1990.

Early career 

Clay made his professional debut on October 29, 1960, winning a six-round decision over Tunney Hunsaker. From then until the end of 1963, Clay amassed a record of 19–0 with 15 wins by knockout. He defeated boxers including Tony Esperti, Jim Robinson, Donnie Fleeman, Alonzo Johnson, George Logan, Willi Besmanoff, LaMar Clark, Doug Jones and Henry Cooper. Clay also beat his former trainer and veteran boxer Archie Moore in a 1962 match.

These early fights were not without trials. Clay was knocked down by both Sonny Banks and Cooper. In the Cooper fight, Clay was floored by a left hook at the end of round four, and was groggy when he got up at the count of three. However, the round had ended by the time he rose, and he recovered between rounds, going on to win in the predicted 5th round due to Cooper's severely cut eye. The fight with Doug Jones on March 13, 1963, was Clay's toughest fight during this stretch. The number two and three heavyweight contenders respectively, Clay and Jones fought on Jones' home turf at New York's Madison Square Garden. Jones staggered Clay in the first round, and the unanimous decision for Clay was greeted by boos and a rain of debris thrown into the ring. Watching on closed-circuit TV, heavyweight champ Sonny Liston quipped that if he fought Clay he might get locked up for murder. The fight was later named "Fight of the Year" by The Ring magazine.

In each of these fights, Clay vocally belittled his opponents and vaunted his abilities. He called Jones "an ugly little man" and Cooper a "bum." He said he was embarrassed to get in the ring with Alex Miteff and claimed that Madison Square Garden was "too small for me." His provocative and outlandish behavior in the ring was inspired by professional wrestler "Gorgeous George" Wagner. Ali stated in a 1969 interview with the Associated Press' Hubert Mizel that he met with Gorgeous George in Las Vegas in 1961 and that the wrestler inspired him to use wrestling jargon when he did interviews.

In 1960, Clay left Moore's camp, partially due to his refusal to do chores such as washing dishes and sweeping. To replace Moore, Clay hired Angelo Dundee to be his trainer. Clay had met Dundee in February 1957 during Clay's amateur career. Around this time, Clay sought longtime idol Sugar Ray Robinson to be his manager, but was rebuffed.

World heavyweight champion

Fights against Liston 

By late 1963, Clay had become the top contender for Sonny Liston's title. The fight was set for February 25, 1964, in Miami Beach. Liston was an intimidating personality, a dominating fighter with a criminal past and ties to the mob. Based on Clay's uninspired performance against Jones and Cooper in his previous two fights, and Liston's destruction of former heavyweight champion Floyd Patterson in two first-round knock outs, Clay was a 7–1 underdog. Despite this, Clay taunted Liston during the pre-fight buildup, dubbing him "the big ugly bear", stating "Liston even smells like a bear" and claiming "After I beat him I'm going to donate him to the zoo." Clay turned the pre-fight weigh-in into a circus, shouting at Liston that "someone is going to die at ringside tonight." Clay's pulse rate was measured at 120, more than double his normal 54. Many of those in attendance thought Clay's behavior stemmed from fear, and some commentators wondered if he would show up for the bout.

The outcome of the fight was a major upset. At the opening bell, Liston rushed at Clay, seemingly angry and looking for a quick knockout. However, Clay's superior speed and mobility enabled him to elude Liston, making the champion miss and look awkward. At the end of the first round, Clay opened up his attack and hit Liston repeatedly with jabs. Liston fought better in round two, but at the beginning of the third round Clay hit Liston with a combination that buckled his knees and opened a cut under his left eye. This was the first time Liston had ever been cut. At the end of round four, Clay was returning to his corner when he began experiencing blinding pain in his eyes and asked his trainer, Angelo Dundee, to cut off his gloves. Dundee refused. It has been speculated that the problem was due to ointment used to seal Liston's cuts, perhaps deliberately applied by his corner to his gloves. Though unconfirmed, boxing historian Bert Sugar claimed that two of Liston's opponents also complained about their eyes "burning."

Despite Liston's attempts to knock out a blinded Clay, Clay was able to survive the fifth round until sweat and tears rinsed the irritation from his eyes. In the sixth, Clay dominated, hitting Liston repeatedly. Liston did not answer the bell for the seventh round, and Clay was declared the winner by TKO. Liston stated that the reason he quit was an injured shoulder. Following the win, a triumphant Clay rushed to the edge of the ring and, pointing to the ringside press, shouted: "Eat your words!" He added, "I am the greatest! I shook up the world. I'm the prettiest thing that ever lived."

At ringside post fight, Clay appeared unconvinced that the fight was stopped due to a Liston shoulder injury, saying that the only injury Liston had was "an open eye, a big cut eye!" When told by Joe Louis that the injury was a "left arm thrown out of its socket," Clay quipped, "Yeah, swinging at nothing, who wouldn't!"

In winning this fight at the age of 22, Clay became the youngest boxer to take the title from a reigning heavyweight champion. However, Floyd Patterson remained the youngest to win the heavyweight championship, doing so at the age 21 during an elimination bout following Rocky Marciano's retirement. Mike Tyson broke both records in 1986 when he defeated Trevor Berbick to win the heavyweight title at age 20.

Soon after the Liston fight, Clay changed his name to Cassius X, and then later to Muhammad Ali upon converting to Islam and affiliating with the Nation of Islam. Ali then faced a rematch with Liston scheduled for May 1965 in Lewiston, Maine. It had been scheduled for Boston the previous November, but was postponed for six months due to Ali's emergency surgery for a hernia three days before. The fight was controversial. Midway through the first round, Liston was knocked down by a difficult-to-see blow the press dubbed a "phantom punch." Referee Jersey Joe Walcott did not begin the count immediately after the knockdown, as Ali refused to retreat to a neutral corner. Liston rose after he had been down for about 20 seconds, and the fight momentarily continued. However a few seconds later Walcott, having been informed by the timekeepers that Liston had been down for a count of 10, stopped the match and declared Ali the winner by knockout. The entire fight lasted less than two minutes.

It has since been speculated that Liston purposely dropped to the ground. Proposed motivations include threats on his life from the Nation of Islam, that he had bet against himself and that he "took a dive" to pay off debts. Slow-motion replays show that Liston was jarred by a chopping right from Ali, although it is unclear whether the blow was a genuine knockout punch.

Fight against Patterson 

Ali defended his title against former heavyweight champion Floyd Patterson on November 22, 1965. Before the match, Ali mocked Patterson, who was widely known to call him by his former name Cassius Clay, as an "Uncle Tom", calling him "The Rabbit". Although Ali clearly had the better of Patterson, who appeared injured during the fight, the match lasted 12 rounds before being called on a technical knockout. Patterson later said he had strained his sacroiliac. Ali was criticized in the sports media for appearing to have toyed with Patterson during the fight. Patterson biographer W.K. Stratton claims that the conflict between Ali and Patterson was not genuine but was staged to increase ticket sales and the closed-circuit viewing audience, with both men complicit in the theatrics. Stratton also cites an interview by Howard Cosell in which Ali explained that rather than toying with Patterson, he refrained from knocking him out after it became apparent Patterson was injured. Patterson himself later said that he'd never been hit by punches as soft as Ali's. Stratton states that Ali arranged the second fight, in 1972, with the financially struggling Patterson to help the former champion earn enough money to pay a debt to the IRS.

Main Bout 
After the Patterson fight, Ali founded his own promotion company, Main Bout. The company handled Ali's boxing promotions and pay-per-view closed-circuit television broadcasts; its stockholders were mainly fellow Nation of Islam members, such as Jabir Herbert Muhammad and the chief aide to Nation of Islam leader Elijah Muhammad, John Ali, along with several others, including Bob Arum, who later founded Top Rank.

Ali and then-WBA heavyweight champion boxer Ernie Terrell had agreed to meet for a bout in Chicago on March 29,1966 (the WBA, one of two boxing associations, had stripped Ali of his title following his signing a rematch with Liston  But in February Ali was reclassified by the Louisville draft board as 1-A from 1-Y, and he indicated that he would refuse to serve, commenting to the press, "I ain't got nothing against no Viet Cong; no Viet Cong never called me nigger." Amidst the media and public outcry over Ali's stance, the Illinois Athletic Commission refused to sanction the fight, citing technicalities.

Instead, Ali traveled to Canada and Europe and won championship bouts against George Chuvalo, Henry Cooper, Brian London and Karl Mildenberger.

Ali returned to the United States to fight Cleveland Williams in the Houston Astrodome on November 14, 1966. The bout drew a record-breaking indoor crowd of 35,460 people. Ali dominated Williams, winning a third-round technical knockout in what some consider the finest performance of his career.

Ali fought Terrell in Houston on February 6, 1967. Terrell, who was unbeaten in five years and had defeated many of the boxers Ali had faced, was billed as Ali's toughest opponent since Liston; he was big, strong and had a three-inch reach advantage over Ali. During the lead up to the bout, Terrell repeatedly called Ali "Clay", much to Ali's annoyance. The two almost came to blows over the name issue in a pre-fight interview with Howard Cosell. Ali seemed intent on humiliating Terrell. "I want to torture him", he said. "A clean knockout is too good for him." The fight was close until the seventh round, when Ali bloodied Terrell and almost knocked him out. In the eighth round, Ali taunted Terrell, hitting him with jabs and shouting between punches, "What's my name, Uncle Tom ... what's my name?" Ali won a unanimous 15-round decision. Terrell claimed that early in the fight Ali deliberately thumbed him in the eye, forcing him to fight half-blind, and then, in a clinch, rubbed the wounded eye against the ropes. Because of Ali's apparent intent to prolong the fight to inflict maximum punishment, critics described the bout as "one of the ugliest boxing fights." Tex Maule later wrote: "It was a wonderful demonstration of boxing skill and a barbarous display of cruelty." Ali denied the accusations of cruelty but, for Ali's critics, the fight provided more evidence of his arrogance.

After Ali's title defense against Zora Folley on March 22, he was stripped of his title due to his refusal to be drafted to army service. His boxing license was also suspended by the state of New York. He was convicted of draft evasion on June 20 and sentenced to five years in prison and a $10,000 fine. He paid a bond and remained free while the verdict was being appealed.

Exile and comeback 
In March 1966, Ali refused to be inducted into the armed forces. He was systematically denied a boxing license in every state and stripped of his passport. As a result, he did not fight from March 1967 to October 1970—from ages 25 to almost 29—as his case worked its way through the appeals process before his conviction was overturned in 1971. During this time of inactivity, as opposition to the Vietnam War began to grow and Ali's stance gained sympathy, he spoke at colleges across the nation, criticizing the Vietnam War and advocating African-American pride and racial justice.

The Super Fight 

While banned from sanctioned bouts, Ali settled a $1 million lawsuit against radio producer Murray Woroner by accepting $10,000 to appear in a privately staged fantasy fight against retired champion Rocky Marciano. In 1969 the boxers were filmed sparring for about 75 one-minute rounds; they acted out several different endings. A computer program purportedly determined the winner, based on data about the fighters. Edited versions of the bout were shown in movie theaters in 1970. In the U.S. version Ali lost in a simulated 13th-round knockout, but in the European version Marciano lost due to cuts, also simulated.

Ali suggested that prejudice determined his defeat in the U.S. version. He was reported to jokingly say, "That computer was made in Alabama."

Return to prizefighting 
On August 11, 1970, with his case still in appeal, Ali was granted a license to box by the City of Atlanta Athletic Commission, thanks to State Senator Leroy R. Johnson. Ali's first return bout was against Jerry Quarry on October 26, resulting in a win after three rounds after Quarry was cut.

A month earlier, a victory in federal court forced the New York State Boxing Commission to reinstate Ali's license. He fought Oscar Bonavena at Madison Square Garden in December, an uninspired performance that ended in a dramatic technical knockout of Bonavena in the 15th round. The win left Ali as a top contender against heavyweight champion Joe Frazier.

First fight against Joe Frazier 

Ali and Frazier's first fight, held at the Garden on March 8, 1971, was nicknamed the "Fight of the Century", due to the tremendous excitement surrounding a bout between two undefeated fighters, each with a legitimate claim as heavyweight champions. Veteran boxing writer John Condon called it "the greatest event I've ever worked on in my life." The bout was broadcast to 35 foreign countries; promoters granted 760 press passes.

Adding to the atmosphere were the considerable pre-fight theatrics and name calling. Ali portrayed Frazier as a "dumb tool of the white establishment." "Frazier is too ugly to be champ", Ali said. "Frazier is too dumb to be champ." Ali also frequently called Frazier an "Uncle Tom". Dave Wolf, who worked in Frazier's camp, recalled that, "Ali was saying 'the only people rooting for Joe Frazier are white people in suits, Alabama sheriffs, and members of the Ku Klux Klan. I'm fighting for the little man in the ghetto.' Joe was sitting there, smashing his fist into the palm of his hand, saying, 'What the fuck does he know about the ghetto?

Ali began training at a farm near Reading, Pennsylvania, in 1971 and, finding the country setting to his liking, sought to develop a real training camp in the countryside. He found a five-acre site on a Pennsylvania country road in the village of Deer Lake, Pennsylvania. On this site, Ali carved out what was to become his training camp, where he trained for all his fights from 1972 to the end of his career in 1981.

The Monday night fight lived up to its billing. In a preview of their two other fights, a crouching, bobbing and weaving Frazier constantly pressured Ali, getting hit regularly by Ali jabs and combinations, but relentlessly attacking and scoring repeatedly, especially to Ali's body. The fight was even in the early rounds, but Ali was taking more punishment than ever in his career. On several occasions in the early rounds he played to the crowd and shook his head "no" after he was hit. In the later rounds—in what was the first appearance of the "rope-a-dope strategy"—Ali leaned against the ropes and absorbed punishment from Frazier, hoping to tire him. In the 11th round, Frazier connected with a left hook that wobbled Ali, but because it appeared that Ali might be clowning as he staggered backwards across the ring, Frazier hesitated to press his advantage, fearing an Ali counter-attack. In the final round, Frazier knocked Ali down with a vicious left hook, which referee Arthur Mercante said was as hard as a man can be hit. Ali was back on his feet in three seconds. Nevertheless, Ali lost by unanimous decision, his first professional defeat.

Chamberlain challenge and Ellis fight 

In 1971, basketball star Wilt Chamberlain challenged Ali to a fight, and a bout was scheduled for July 26. Although the seven-foot-two-inch tall Chamberlain had formidable physical advantages over Ali— weighing 60pounds more and able to reach 14inches further —Ali was able to influence Chamberlain into calling off the bout by taunting him with calls of "Timber!" and "The tree will fall" during a shared interview. These statements of confidence unsettled his taller opponent, whom Los Angeles Lakers owner Jack Kent Cooke had offered a record-setting contract, conditional on Chamberlain agreeing to abandon what Cooke termed "this boxing foolishness," and he did exactly that. To replace Ali's opponent, promoter Bob Arum quickly booked a former sparring partner of Ali's, Jimmy Ellis, who was a childhood friend from Louisville, Kentucky, to fight him.

Fights against Quarry, Patterson, Foster and Norton 
After the loss to Frazier, Ali fought Jerry Quarry, had a second bout with Floyd Patterson and faced Bob Foster in 1972, winning a total of six fights that year. In 1973, Ken Norton broke Ali's jaw while giving him the second loss of his career. After initially considering retirement, Ali won a controversial decision against Norton in their second bout. This led to a rematch with Joe Frazier at Madison Square Garden on January 28, 1974; Frazier had recently lost his title to George Foreman.

Second fight against Joe Frazier 

Ali was strong in the early rounds of the fight, and staggered Frazier in the second round. Referee Tony Perez mistakenly thought he heard the bell ending the round and stepped between the two fighters as Ali was pressing his attack, giving Frazier time to recover. However, Frazier came on in the middle rounds, snapping Ali's head in round seven and driving him to the ropes at the end of round eight. The last four rounds saw round-to-round shifts in momentum between the two fighters. Throughout most of the bout, however, Ali was able to circle away from Frazier's dangerous left hook and to tie Frazier up when he was cornered, the latter a tactic that Frazier's camp complained of bitterly. Judges awarded Ali a unanimous decision.

World heavyweight champion (second reign)

The Rumble in the Jungle 

The defeat of Frazier set the stage for a title fight against heavyweight champion George Foreman in Kinshasa, Zaire, on October 30, 1974—a bout nicknamed The Rumble in the Jungle. Foreman was considered one of the hardest punchers in heavyweight history. In assessing the fight, analysts pointed out that Joe Frazier and Ken Norton, who had given Ali four tough battles and won two of them, had both been devastated by Foreman in second-round knockouts. Ali was 32 years old, and had clearly lost speed and reflexes since his twenties. Contrary to his later persona, Foreman was at the time a brooding and intimidating presence. Almost no-one associated with the sport, not even Ali's long-time supporter Howard Cosell, gave the former champion a chance of winning.

As usual, Ali was confident and colorful before the fight. He told interviewer David Frost, "If you think the world was surprised when Nixon resigned, wait 'til I whup Foreman's behind!" He told the press, "I've done something new for this fight. I done wrestled with an alligator, I done tussled with a whale; handcuffed lightning, thrown thunder in jail; only last week, I murdered a rock, injured a stone, hospitalized a brick; I'm so mean I make medicine sick." Ali was wildly popular in Zaire, with crowds chanting "Ali, bomaye" ("Ali, kill him") wherever he went.

Ali opened the fight moving and scoring with right crosses to Foreman's head. Then, beginning in the second round, and to the consternation of his corner, Ali retreated to the ropes and invited Foreman to hit him while covering up, clinching and counter-punching, all while verbally taunting Foreman. The move, which would later become known as the "Rope-a-dope", so violated conventional boxing wisdom—letting one of the hardest hitters in boxing strike at will—that at ringside writer George Plimpton thought the fight had to be fixed. Foreman, increasingly angered, threw punches that were deflected and did not land squarely. Midway through the fight, as Foreman began tiring, Ali countered more frequently and effectively with punches and flurries, which electrified the pro-Ali crowd. In the eighth round, Ali dropped an exhausted Foreman with a combination at center ring; Foreman failed to make the count. Against the odds, and amidst pandemonium in the ring, Ali had regained the title by knockout. Reflecting on the fight, George Foreman later said: "I thought Ali was just one more knockout victim until, about the seventh round, I hit him hard to the jaw and he held me and whispered in my ear: 'That all you got, George?' I realized that this ain't what I thought it was."

Fights against Wepner, Lyle and Bugner 
Ali's next opponents included Chuck Wepner, Ron Lyle, and Joe Bugner. Wepner, a journeyman known as "The Bayonne Bleeder", stunned Ali with a knockdown in the ninth round; Ali would later say he tripped on Wepner's foot. It was a bout that would inspire Sylvester Stallone to create the acclaimed film, Rocky.

Third fight against Joe Frazier 

Ali then agreed to a third match with Joe Frazier in Manila. The bout, known as the "Thrilla in Manila", was held on October 1, 1975, in temperatures approaching . In the first rounds, Ali was aggressive, moving and exchanging blows with Frazier. However, Ali soon appeared to tire and adopted the "rope-a-dope" strategy, frequently resorting to clinches. During this part of the bout Ali did some effective counter-punching, but for the most part absorbed punishment from a relentlessly attacking Frazier. In the 12th round, Frazier began to tire, and Ali scored several sharp blows that closed Frazier's left eye and opened a cut over his right eye. With Frazier's vision now diminished, Ali dominated the 13th and 14th rounds, at times conducting what boxing historian Mike Silver called "target practice" on Frazier's head. The fight was stopped when Frazier's trainer, Eddie Futch, refused to allow Frazier to answer the bell for the 15th and final round, despite Frazier's protests. Frazier's eyes were both swollen shut. Ali, in his corner, winner by TKO, slumped on his stool, clearly spent.

An ailing Ali said afterwards that the fight "was the closest thing to dying that I know", and, when later asked if he had viewed the fight on videotape, reportedly said, "Why would I want to go back and see Hell?" After the fight he cited Frazier as "the greatest fighter of all times next to me."

Later career 

Following the Manila bout, Ali fought Jean-Pierre Coopman, Jimmy Young, and Richard Dunn, winning the last by knockout.

On June 1, 1976, Ali removed his shirt and jacket and confronted professional wrestler Gorilla Monsoon in the ring after his match at a World Wide Wrestling Federation show in Philadelphia Arena. After dodging a few punches, Monsoon put Ali in an airplane spin and dumped him to the mat. Ali stumbled to the corner, where his associate Butch Lewis convinced him to walk away.

On June 26, 1976, Ali participated in an exhibition bout in Tokyo against Japanese professional wrestler and martial artist Antonio Inoki. Ali was only able to land two jabs while Inoki's kicks caused two blood clots and an infection that almost resulted in Ali's leg being amputated. The match was not scripted and ultimately declared a draw. After Ali's death, The New York Times declared it his least memorable fight. Most boxing commentators at the time viewed the fight negatively and hoped it would be forgotten as some considered it a "15-round farce." Today it is considered by some to be one of Ali's most influential fights and CBS Sports said the attention the mixed-style bout received "foretold the arrival of standardized MMA years later."

Ali fought Ken Norton for the third time in September 1976. The bout, which was held at Yankee Stadium, resulted in Ali winning a heavily contested decision that was loudly booed by the audience. Afterwards, he announced he was retiring from boxing to practice his faith, having converted to Sunni Islam after falling out with the Nation of Islam the previous year.

After returning to box in two exhibition bouts in April 1977 against a then 18-year-old Michael Dokes and journeyman Jody Ballard, Ali successfully defended his title for the 9th time against Alfredo Evangelista in May. Ali fought again in September 1977, struggling in a 10th title defence against hard-hitting contender Earnie Shavers. Ali was hurt in the second round but ultimately won the fight by another unanimous decision. The bout caused his long-time doctor Ferdie Pacheco to quit after he was rebuffed for telling Ali he should retire. Pacheco was quoted as saying, "the New York State Athletic Commission gave me a report that showed Ali's kidneys were falling apart. I wrote to Angelo Dundee, Ali's trainer, his wife and Ali himself. I got nothing back in response. That's when I decided enough is enough."

In February 1978, Ali faced Leon Spinks at the Hilton Hotel in Las Vegas. At the time, Spinks had only seven professional fights to his credit, and had recently fought a draw with journeyman Scott LeDoux. Ali sparred less than two dozen rounds in preparation for the fight, and was out of shape. He lost the title by split decision. Ali sought to regain his title however, and a rematch was scheduled for the fall of 1978.  

Ali started training early and even travelled to Moscow, Russia to box in three exhibition fights in June of that year against Soviet Amateur champion Igor Vysotsky, Pyotar Zayev and Yevgeny Gorstkov.  Embarrassed by the Spinks loss, Ali purportedly sparred over 200 rounds in his preparation for the rematch, seemingly determined to regain his title. The Spinks rematch took place in September 1978 at the Superdome in New Orleans, Louisiana. A then-record 63,350 people attended the bout and paid a total of $6 million in admission, making it the largest live gate in boxing history at that time. A fitter and sharper Ali, although noticeably slower than his prime years, danced around Spinks and scored from range for the majority of the bout, holding his much younger opponent every time he got in close.  Ali won a well deserved unanimous decision, with referee Lucien Joubert scoring rounds 10–4, judge Ernie Cojoe 10–4, and judge Herman Preis 11–4. This made Ali the first heavyweight champion to win the lineal title three times.

Following this win, on July 27, 1979, Ali announced his retirement from boxing. His retirement was short-lived, however; Ali announced his comeback to face Larry Holmes for the WBC belt in an attempt to win the heavyweight championship an unprecedented fourth time. The fight was largely motivated by Ali's need for money. Holmes' trainer Richie Giachetti said, "Larry didn't want to fight Ali. He knew Ali had nothing left; he knew it would be a horror."

It was around this time that Ali started struggling with vocal stutters and trembling hands. The Nevada Athletic Commission (NAC) ordered that he undergo a complete physical in Las Vegas before being allowed to fight again. Ali chose instead to check into the Mayo Clinic, who declared him fit to fight. Their opinion was accepted by the NAC on July 31, 1980, paving the way for Ali's return to the ring.

The fight took place on October 2, 1980, in Las Vegas Valley, with Holmes easily dominating Ali, who was weakened from thyroid medication he had taken to lose weight. Giachetti called the fight "awful ... the worst sports event I ever had to cover." Actor Sylvester Stallone was at ringside and said that it was like watching an autopsy on a man who is still alive. In the eleventh round, Angelo Dundee told the referee to stop the fight, making it the only time that Ali ever lost by stoppage. After the fight, Holmes went back to his dressing room and cried. The Holmes fight is said to have contributed to Ali's Parkinson's syndrome. Despite pleas to definitively retire, Ali fought one last time on December 11, 1981, in Nassau, Bahamas, against Trevor Berbick, losing a ten-round decision.

By the end of his boxing career Ali had absorbed 200,000 hits.

Boxing style

Ali had a highly unorthodox boxing style for a heavyweight (210 pounds), epitomized by his catchphrase "float like a butterfly, sting like a bee." Never an overpowering puncher, Ali relied early in his career on his incredible hand speed, superb reflexes and constant movement, dancing and circling opponents for most of the fight, holding his hands low and lashing out with a quick, cutting left jab that he threw from unpredictable angles. His footwork was so strong that it was extremely difficult for opponents to cut down the ring and corner Ali against the ropes. He was also able to quickly dodge punches with his speed, head movement, dancing and footwork.

One of Ali's greatest tricks was to make opponents overcommit by pulling straight backward from punches. Disciplined, world-class boxers chased Ali and threw themselves off balance attempting to hit him because he seemed to be an open target, only missing and leaving themselves exposed to Ali's counter punches, usually a chopping right. Slow motion replays show that this was precisely the way Sonny Liston was hit and apparently knocked out by Ali in their second fight. Ali often flaunted his movement by dancing the "Ali Shuffle", a sort of center-ring jig. Ali's early style was so unusual that he was initially discounted because he reminded boxing writers of a lightweight, and it was assumed he would be vulnerable to big hitters like Sonny Liston.

Jimmy Jacobs, who co-managed Mike Tyson, used a synchronizer to measure young Ali's punching speed versus Sugar Ray Robinson, a welter/middleweight who was considered pound-for-pound the best fighter in history. Ali was 25% faster than Robinson, even though Ali was 45–50pounds heavier. Ali's punches produced approximately 1,000pounds of force. "No matter what his opponents heard about him, they didn't realize how fast he was until they got in the ring with him", Jacobs said. The effect of Ali's punches was cumulative. Charlie Powell, who fought Ali early in Ali's career and was knocked out in the third round, said: "When he first hit me I said to myself, 'I can take two of these to get one in myself.' But in a little while I found myself getting dizzier and dizzier every time he hit me. He throws punches so easily that you don't realize how much they hurt you until it's too late."

Commenting on fighting the young Ali, George Chuvalo said: "He was just so damn fast. When he was young, he moved his legs and hands at the same time. He threw his punches when he was in motion. He'd be out of punching range, and as he moved into range he'd already begun to throw the punch. So if you waited until he got into range to punch back, he beat you every time."

Floyd Patterson said, "It's very hard to hit a moving target, and (Ali) moved all the time, with such grace, three minutes of every round for fifteen rounds. He never stopped. It was extraordinary."

Darrell Foster, who trained Will Smith for the movie Ali, said: "Ali's signature punches were the left jab and the overhand right. But there were at least six different ways Ali used to jab. One was a jab that Ali called the 'snake lick', like cobra striking that comes from the floor almost, really low down. Then there was Ali's rapid-fire jab—three to five jabs in succession rapidly fired at his opponents' eyes to create a blur in [the latter's] face so he wouldn't be able to see [Ali's] right hand coming behind it."

Footwork

An unconventional "dancing" style of footwork was popularized by Ali in the 1960s. He moved side to side, and forward and back, while bouncing on the balls of his feet and dancing around his opponents. This allowed him to quickly move to wherever he wanted in the ring. He also occasionally shuffled his feet back and forth quickly, confusing his opponents before landing a blow, a move called the Ali shuffle. His unconventional footwork was referred to as the "dancing legs" at the time.

Ali's footwork notably influenced martial artist and actor Bruce Lee, who studied Ali's footwork and incorporated it into his own Jeet Kune Do style of hybrid martial arts in the 1960s.

Trash-talk

Ali regularly taunted and baited his opponents—including Liston, Frazier, and Foreman—before the fight and often during the bout itself. He said Frazier was "too dumb to be champion", that he would whip Liston "like his Daddy did", that Terrell was an "Uncle Tom" for refusing to call Ali by his name and continuing to call him Cassius Clay, calling Patterson a "rabbit", and calling Foreman "a mummy".  In speaking of how Ali stoked Liston's anger and overconfidence before their first fight, one writer commented that "the most brilliant fight strategy in boxing history was devised by a teenager who had graduated 376 in a class of 391."

Ali typically portrayed himself as the "people's champion" and his opponent as a tool of the (white) establishment. During the early part of his career, he built a reputation for predicting rounds in which he would finish opponents, often vowing to crawl across the ring or to leave the country if he lost the bout. Ali adopted the latter practice from "Gorgeous" George Wagner, a professional wrestling champion who drew thousands of fans to his matches as "the man you love to hate." When Ali was 19, Wagner, who was in town to wrestle Freddie Blassie and had crossed paths with Clay, told the boxer before a bout with Duke Sabedong in Las Vegas, "A lot of people will pay to see someone shut your mouth. So keep on bragging, keep on sassing and always be outrageous."

ESPN columnist Ralph Wiley called Ali "The King of Trash Talk". In 2013, The Guardian said Ali exemplified boxing's "golden age of trash-talking." Bleacher Report called Clay's description of Sonny Liston smelling like a bear and his vow to donate him to a zoo after he beat him the greatest trash-talk line in sports history.

Rope-a-dope

In the opinion of many observers, Ali became a different fighter after the 3½-year layoff. Ferdie Pacheco, Ali's corner physician, noted that he had lost his ability to move and dance as before. This forced Ali to become more stationary and exchange punches more frequently, exposing him to more punishment while indirectly revealing his tremendous ability to take a punch. This physical change led in part to the "rope-a-dope" strategy, where Ali would lie back on the ropes, cover up to protect himself and conserve energy, and tempt opponents to punch themselves out. Ali often taunted opponents in the process and lashed back with sudden, unexpected combinations. The strategy was dramatically successful in the George Foreman fight, but less so in the first Joe Frazier bout when it was introduced.

Later years
Of his later career, Arthur Mercante said: "Ali knew all the tricks. He was the best fighter I ever saw in terms of clinching. Not only did he use it to rest, but he was big and strong and knew how to lean on opponents and push and shove and pull to tire them out. Ali was so smart. Most guys are just in there fighting, but Ali had a sense of everything that was happening, almost as though he was sitting at ringside analyzing the fight while he fought it."

In the mid-1970s, Ali took an interest in Asian martial arts, such as karate and taekwondo. The founder of American taekwondo, Jhoon Goo Rhee, coached Ali for several fights. A punching technique that Rhee taught him was the "accupunch", a technique that Rhee himself had originally learnt from Bruce Lee. The "accupunch" is a rapid fast punch that is very difficult to block, based on human reaction time—"the idea is to finish the execution of the punch before the opponent can complete the brain-to-wrist communication." Ali was reportedly unable to block the punch when Rhee first demonstrated it to him. Ali later used the "accupunch" to knockout Richard Dunn in 1976.

Ali and his contemporaries

Ali and Frazier

Friendship
In an interview published in 2002, Joe Frazier recalled that he had first met Ali around 1968. At this time Ali was continuing his legal fight to get his boxing license back, and Frazier was the undisputed heavyweight champion of the world. Frazier stated that he had campaigned vigorously for Ali to get his license; this included going to Washington and meeting the president to lobby on Ali's behalf. Frazier also lent Ali some money at this time.

According to Dave Wolf, former sports editor of Life and a member of Frazier's entourage, Frazier was keen for Ali's return to boxing, because he believed that beating Ali would win him unambiguous acknowledgement as the "best." According to Wolf, Frazier was also kind to Ali during this time—agreeing to participate in staged confrontations, which enabled Ali to get publicity and earn money giving lectures. Wolf states that Frazier had deep respect for Ali's religious beliefs, and even participated in Muslim services at Ali's suggestion. Until Ali got "nasty" before their first fight, Frazier endorsed Ali's refusal to be drafted; Wolf recalls: "I remember [Frazier] telling me, 'If Baptists weren't allowed to fight, I wouldn't fight either'."

Ali and Frazier knew they would become wealthy if Ali returned to the ring. Prior to their first fight, both had expressed a liking for each other. In 1970, Ali had stated: "Me and Joe Frazier will be buddies. I just want it to go down in history that I didn't sell out or Uncle Tom when I got famous, and I don't think Joe Frazier's going to do that either. He ain't dumb."

Opponents
Ali and Frazier fought three fights in the span of five years; the first and third of these are widely regarded to be among the greatest of all boxing bouts, and the Ali-Frazier rivalry has been hailed as one of the greatest any sport has seen. Writing in Sports Illustrated, William Nack commented: 

According to Ali, Frazier's style of boxing made him a tougher opponent for him than Liston or Foreman because he was vulnerable to Frazier's in-close left hook. Had he fought with Frazier before his three-and-half year break from boxing, when he was younger, "I'd have danced for fifteen rounds, and Joe wouldn't have ever caught me."

After Thrilla in Manila, Frazier called Ali "a great champion", and, referring to Ali, graciously stated that "[m]y man fought a good fight"; while Ali declared Frazier to be "the greatest fighter of all time next to me."

Trash-talk and altercations
In the buildup to their bouts, Ali called Frazier "dumb" and an "Uncle Tom" before their first, "ignorant" before the second, and a "gorilla" before the third. Writers Dennis and Don Atyeo have noted that given Ali's warm words for Frazier in the past, his jibes about Frazier sounded hollow.

On January 23, 1974, five days before their second fight, Ali and Frazier had a public altercation captured on television. ABC Sports' Howard Cosell had arranged for the two to come to the studio to comment on their first fight. Things went smoothly until Frazier commented about Ali having to visit a hospital after the fight. Ali immediately responded by claiming he had gone to a hospital for ten minutes whereas Frazier had been hospitalized for three weeks after the fight, and concluded by calling Frazier "ignorant." Frazier then snapped; removing his studio earplug, Frazier reached across to Ali, protesting the use of the word "ignorant." Soon the two were wrestling on the floor, until they were separated by onlookers.

According to veteran boxing commentator Ronnie Nathanielsz, during the buildup to Thrilla in Manilla, Ali once awakened Frazier in the middle of the night by constantly screaming. When Frazier appeared on the balcony of his hotel room, Ali pointed a toy gun at him and shouted: "I am going to shoot you."

Immediately after Thrilla in Manilla, Ali summoned Frazier's son Marvis to his dressing room and apologized for the things he had said about Frazier. When Marvis conveyed Ali's contrition to his father, Frazier commented that Ali should have communicated this to him directly. After returning to the United States, Ali called boxing promoter and manager Butch Lewis, and asked for Frazier's private number, saying he wanted to apologize to Frazier. However, when Lewis conveyed this request to Frazier, he was told not to share the phone number with Ali.

Finale
In 1988, Ali and Frazier joined George Foreman, Larry Holmes, and Ken Norton in Las Vegas for the making of the film Champions Forever. At a local gym, Frazier came across Ali before a crowd of spectators, and said: "Look at Ali. Look what's happened to him. All your talkin', man. I'm faster than you are now. You're damaged goods." Ali, already afflicted with Parkinson's, insisted that he remained faster than Frazier and pointing to a heavy bag suggested the two compete to see which of them could hit the bag the fastest. Frazier immediately took off his coat, moved to the bag and threw a dozen rapid punches at it accompanied by loud grunts. Without removing his coat, Ali strolled towards the bag, held the ready stance, mimicked one of Frazier's grunts without throwing a punch, and then addressed Frazier with the words "Wanna see it again, Joe?" Everyone laughed, except Frazier.

Later that day, Frazier started walking towards Ali after having had too much to drink. Ali biographer Thomas Hauser, who was present, recalled that for the next 10 minutes Larry Holmes positioned himself between Ali and Frazier, preventing Frazier from reaching Ali. George Foreman then took over and acted as Ali's shield for the next 10 minutes. Throughout this incident, Ali remained oblivious to what was going on.

In his 1996 autobiography Smokin' Joe: The Autobiography of a Heavyweight Champion of the World, in which he always refers to Ali as Cassius Clay, Frazier wrote: 

Commenting on Ali lighting the Olympic flame in 1996, Frazier stated that it would have been good if Ali had fallen into the cauldron after lighting the flame, and that he would have pushed Ali in himself if he had the chance to do so. In a press conference held on July 30, 1996, Frazier accused Ali of being a "draft dodger" and a racist, and claimed he would have been a better choice to light the Olympic flame. Also in 1996, Frazier claimed Ali was suffering from "Joe Frazier-itis" and "left-hook-itis."

In a 1997 interview, Frazier expressed no regret for the words he had used for Ali at the 1996 Atlanta Olympics. According to Frazier: 

In a 2001 interview with The New York Times, Ali again apologized to Frazier for calling him names which, Ali claimed, was done to promote their fights. Frazier initially accepted the apology saying it was time to put this issue behind them. However, subsequently Frazier commented that Ali should apologize directly to him instead of apologizing through a newspaper. Reacting to this, Ali stated: "If you see Frazier, you tell him he's still a gorilla."

In his interview in Stephen Brunt's 2002 book Facing Ali, Frazier, referring to how he had contributed to Ali's infirmity, claimed he was sure Ali thinks of him whenever he gets out of bed, and that whatever Ali was undergoing was the will of God.

In a 2008 interview, Frazier stated he had forgiven Ali, but was unable to comment on whether Ali's present condition was due to divine punishment, as he had earlier stated, since "God works in a mysterious way."

In 2011, on the eve of the 40th anniversary of his first fight with Ali, and the year of his death, Frazier reiterated that he had forgiven Ali. Frazier's funeral service was attended by Ali who reportedly stood and clapped vigorously when the Rev. Jesse Jackson asked the mourners to stand and bring their hands together one last time for Frazier.

Titles in boxing

Major world titles
WBA heavyweight champion (4×)
WBC heavyweight champion (2×)

Other world titles

The Ring magazine titles
The Ring heavyweight champion (3×)

Lineal titles
Lineal heavyweight champion (3×)

Regional titles
NABF heavyweight champion (3×)
National Golden Gloves champion (2×)
Kentucky Golden Gloves champion (6×)

Honorary titles and awards
AAU champion (2×)
Olympic light heavyweight champion (gold medal)
Sports Illustrated Sportsman of the Year
Associated Press Athlete of the Year
International Press Athlete of the Year
BWAA Fighter of the Year (3×)
International Boxing Hall of Fame
The Ring Fighter of the Year (6×)
The Ring Fight of the Year (6×)

Accolades
Sports Illustrated Sportsman of the Century
BBC Sports Personality of the Century
CSHL Double Helix Medal Honoree
Martin Luther King Memorial Award
Presidential Citizens Medal
Presidential Medal of Freedom
Otto Hahn Peace Medal
Hollywood Walk of Fame
Philadelphia Liberty Medal

Professional boxing record

Exhibition boxing record

The following list does not include matches in which the opponent's name, location or exact date is unknown such as the one that took place in Genoa, Italy against Alonzo Johnson and Giorgio Bambini around 1971, and the one that took place in Casablanca, Morocco around 1979. Exhibition contests do not count on a professional or amateur boxer's official record.

Television viewership

Muhammad Ali's fights were some of the world's most-watched television broadcasts, setting television viewership records. Some of his most-watched fights drew an estimated 12 billion viewers worldwide between 1974 and 1980, and were the world's most-watched live television broadcasts at the time.

Pay-per-view bouts
The earliest form of pay-per-view boxing telecasts was closed-circuit television, also known as theatre television, where fights were telecast live to a select number of venues, mostly theaters, where viewers paid for tickets to watch the fight live. The use of closed-circuit for boxing telecasts peaked in popularity with Ali in the 1960s and 1970s. Most of Ali's closed-circuit telecasts were handled by his promotion company Main Bout. The following table lists known ticket sales/buys for Ali fights at closed-circuit venues/theaters:

Professional boxing was introduced to pay-per-view home cable television with several Muhammad Ali fights, especially the Thrilla in Manila fight between Ali and Joe Frazier in 1975, which was transmitted through HBO. Ali had several fights broadcast on early pay-per-view home television:

See also

 List of heavyweight boxing champions
 List of WBA world champions
 List of WBC world champions
 List of The Ring world champions
 List of undisputed boxing champions
 Notable boxing families

Notes

References

External links

https://boxrec.com/media/index.php/NYSAC_World_Heavyweight_Champion

 
African-American boxers
Boxers from Kentucky
International Boxing Hall of Fame inductees
Medalists at the 1960 Summer Olympics
Olympic cauldron lighters
The Ring (magazine) champions
Winners of the United States Championship for amateur boxers
World Boxing Association champions
World Boxing Council champions
World heavyweight boxing champions